The 1993–94 Elitserien season was the 19th season of the Elitserien, the top level of ice hockey in Sweden. 12 teams participated in the league, and Malmö IF won the championship.

Standings

First round

Final round

Playoffs

External links
 Swedish sport official site
14 April 1994 interview with Peter Forsberg during 1994 Swedish national championship final at SVT's open archive 

1993–94 in Swedish ice hockey
Swedish Hockey League seasons
Swed